03 numbers may refer to:
 non-geographic telephone numbers in the United Kingdom charged at geographic rates,
 telephone area codes in the eastern part of Germany, see: telephone numbers in Germany.